In music, Op. 29 stands for Opus number 29. Compositions that are assigned this number include:

 Beethoven – String Quintet, Op. 29
 Chopin – Impromptu No. 1
 Enescu – Piano Quintet
 Finzi – Intimations of Immortality
 Hindemith – Klaviermusik mit Orchester
 Holst – St Paul's Suite
 Liebermann – Gargoyles
 Madetoja – Symphony No. 1
 Nielsen – Symphony No. 4
 Prokofiev – Piano Sonata No. 4
 Rachmaninoff – Isle of the Dead
 Ries – Clarinet Sonata
 Saint-Saëns – Piano Concerto No. 3
 Schubert – String Quartet No. 13
 Schumann – 3 Gedichte
 Scriabin – Symphony No. 2
 Shostakovich – Lady Macbeth of the Mtsensk District
 Sibelius – Snöfrid
 Strauss – Traum durch die Dämmerung
 Suk – A Summer's Tale
 Szymanowski – Métopes
 Tchaikovsky – Symphony No. 3
 Waterhouse – Mouvements d'Harmonie